Nana Adoma Owusu-Afriyie (born 22 March 1999) is an Australian athlete. She competed in the women's 4 × 100 metres relay event at the 2019 World Athletics Championships.

In August 2020, she was studying a Bachelor of Nutrition Science at Deakin University.

References

External links
 

1999 births
Living people
Australian female sprinters
Place of birth missing (living people)
World Athletics Championships athletes for Australia
Medalists at the 2019 Summer Universiade
Universiade silver medalists for Australia
Universiade medalists in athletics (track and field)